Alexander Langeweg (30 March 1890 – 30 November 1961) was a Dutch composer. His work was part of the music event in the art competition at the 1936 Summer Olympics.

References

1890 births
1961 deaths
Dutch composers
Olympic competitors in art competitions
People from Arnhem